William Guillén Padilla (born April 26, 1963) is a Peruvian poet and storyteller. He excels in the genre of literary minifiction.

Bibliography

Poetry

Minifiction

Stories

Novel

Awards and distinctions 

 Lima, 2010 "Libro de Poesía Breve"
 Caracas, 2006 "III Concurso Radial y I Concurso Televisivo de Cuento Breve Librería Mediática" (Finalist)
 Lima, 2010 "XVI Bienal de Cuento 'Premio Copé Internacional'" (Finalist)
 Barcelona, 2012 "Concurso de Microrrelatos 'La Casa Vacía'" (Finalist)
 Ohio, 2016. IV Concurso Internacional de Novela Contacto Latino. (2nd Place)

References

External links 
  

1963 births
Living people
20th-century Peruvian poets
Storytellers
Peruvian male poets
21st-century Peruvian poets
20th-century male writers
21st-century male writers